Bombay Cricket Club was an Indian and Middle Eastern restaurant in Portland, Oregon's Buckman neighborhood, in the United States.

Description
Bombay Cricket Club was an Indian and Middle Eastern restaurant on Hawthorne Boulevard in southeast Portland's Buckman neighborhood, owned by Karim and Sherri Ammad. According to The Oregonian Michael Russell, "Like its predecessor, Masala Grove, the Bombay Cricket Club combined decadent Indian dishes with a handful of Middle Eastern specialties." The menu included coconut curry with prawns, lamb vindaloo, samosas, tandoori lamb, and mango margaritas. The restaurant aired cricket matches on televisions.

History
In August 2016, owners confirmed plans to retire and close the restaurant on August 31, after operating for 21 years. The vegetarian Indian restaurant Maruti began operating in the space in November.

Reception
In 2003, Willamette Week Kelly Clarke said, "Saburo's, along with places like Bombay Cricket Club and Escape from New York Pizza shake up routine meals by challenging our notion of what makes great restaurants tick." Bombay Cricket Club was named Best Indian Restaurant by Portland Monthly in 2004. In 2016, the magazine's Michelle Porter said the restaurant had "[maintained] its reputation (and long lines) through several food revolutions—including the rise of Bollywood Theater". In 2016, Michael Russell of The Oregonian said the tandoori lamb was a "standout" and wrote, "In the days before Bollywood Theater introduced Portland to Indian street snacks and Hillsboro's Indian food scene had blossomed, Bombay Cricket Club was considered among the best Indian restaurants in Portland. Judging from recent comments on the restaurant's Facebook page, it remained a favorite for many both inside and outside of Portland." The newspaper's Grant Butler included Bombay Cricket Club in a 2016 list of "97 long-gone Portland restaurants we wish were still around", writing, "For years, one of the happiest places along lower Southeast Hawthorne Avenue was a seat at the bar at this popular Northern Indian spot."

See also

 List of defunct restaurants of the United States
 List of Indian restaurants
 List of Middle Eastern restaurants

References

External links
 Bombay Cricket Club at Zomato

2016 disestablishments in Oregon
Buckman, Portland, Oregon
Defunct Asian restaurants in Portland, Oregon
Defunct Indian restaurants
Defunct Middle Eastern restaurants
Indian restaurants in Oregon
Indian-American culture in Portland, Oregon
Middle Eastern restaurants in the United States
Middle Eastern-American culture in Portland, Oregon
Restaurants disestablished in 2016